Daniel Hourcade (born San Miguel de Tucumán, 1958) is an Argentine rugby union coach and former player. He has coached at various levels of the game, at both club and international level. He has coached in Argentina, France and Portugal, and was head coach of the Argentine national team having come through the ranks with the sevens national team, Argentina Jaguars and Pampas XV.

Career
He had a brief player career at the Universitario Rugby Club de Tucumán. He began his coaching career in 1993 where he worked up the coaching ranks in the Universitario Rugby Club de Tucumán side. This included a three-year tenure as the head coach of the Senior side. He left the Tucumán side to become  head coach of the Argentina Under-21 side before being named head coach of the Argentina sevens side between 2001 and 2004.

Hourcade left the Argentine Rugby Union (UAR) in 2004 to take up the role of head coach of Portuguese domestic club Grupo Desportivo Direito. This role was on a par with his duties as head coach of Portugal sevens side and assistant head coach of the Portugal national side - which was his role through Portugal's first appearance in the 2007 Rugby World Cup. He finished his stint in Portugal in 2008 following his stint as head coach for the Portugal women's national rugby union team. Hourcade also had a brief stint in France when he coached Stade Rouennais in the Fédérale 2 league.

Hourcade returned to the UAR in 2010 when he became the head coach of the Argentina Jaguars, where he led the Jaguars to four consecutive championships in the Americas Rugby Championship and led the team to second in the IRB Nations Cup. He also led the team to numerous victories over test sides including a 2-0 test series win over Russia in 2010.

Pampas XV
In 2010, he became the first coach of the newly formed side Pampas XV, a team that was based in South Africa that would compete annually in the Vodacom Cup. In the 2010 Vodacom Cup, Pampas finished fifth, just outside the play-off positioning. However, in the 2011 Vodacom Cup, Hourcade led the side to top of the Southern Section table with 8 from 8 victories, he led the Pampas XV to the final. His side would have to face the defending champions the Blue Bulls who lost 14-9 on this occasion. However, in 2012 he was unable to retain the title, losing in the Quarter finals to  26–18.

Argentina national coach
In October 2013, his Argentina coaching career reached its apex when he was announced as head coach for the national senior side for the 2013 end-of-year rugby union tests through to the 2015 Rugby World Cup. His first match in charge was against England on 9 November 2013, losing 31–12. A week later, Argentina lost to Wales 40–6, which was Wales' largest ever win over the Pumas, however, Hourcade earned his first victory as coach against Italy on 23 November 2013, winning 19–14 at the Stadio Olimpico in Rome.

In May 2014, he revived his first silverware, having won all the matches in the 2014 CONSUR Cup, defeating Uruguay, 65–9, and Chile, 73–12. In June 2014, Argentina contested the Admiral Brown Cup, a trophy contested between Argentina and Ireland. Ireland claimed the trophy having won both matches 29–17 and 23–17 respectively. During the 2014 Rugby Championship, Argentina suffered several close defeats - losing 13–6 and 31–33 to South Africa home and away, but on 5 October 2014, Hourcade guided Argentina to their first ever win in the Rugby Championship, defeating Australia 21-17 at the Estadio Malvinas Argentinas in Mendoza. Not only was this their first win in the Rugby Champions, but it was their first win over Australia in 17 years. Despite that win, Argentina finished in last place in the Rugby Championship for the third consecutive year.

During their 2014 end-of-year tour, Hourcade led Argentina to two victories from three. Their only loss was to Scotland, 41–31. They did however defeat Italy 20–18 and France 18–13 - Argentina's first win over France in France since 2007.

In 2015, he led the team (acting as Argentina Jaguars) to two consecutive uncapped wins over the USA Selects in April, before guiding the national XV side to their second consecutive CONSUR Cup, with wins over Uruguay and Paraguay respectively. However, on 27 May just 4 days after clinching the CONSUR Cup, he led the Argentina Jaguars side to a narrow 21–23 defeat to the Fiji Warriors. During the 2015 Rugby Championship, Hourcade led Argentina to third, the first time they hadn't finished in bottom place. Haven lost to New Zealand in the opening round 39–18, then to Australia 34–9 in Argentina's only home match of the Championship, Argentina went into the final round against South Africa on 0 points. However, Hourcade led Argentina to their first ever victory over South Africa winning 37–25.

During the 2015 Rugby World Cup, Hourcade led Argentina to fourth. Haven only lost to New Zealand in their group, 26–16, despite leading 12–11 at half time, they went on to finish second in Pool C with victories over Georgia 54–9, Tonga 45–16, and Namibia 64–19. Argentina had scored the most points than any other team during the pool stage, and their attacking rugby continued when they beat Ireland 43–20 in the quarter-final, which was their first victory over Ireland since 2007, while setting a new record for biggest winning margin over the Irish. They faced Australia in the semi-final, however, Argentina failed to capitalize on opportunities and failed to score in their 29–15 defeat. 5 days later, Hourcade led Argentina to fourth in the world, losing to South Africa in the Bronze final 24–13.	

In the 2016 June international window, Hourcade led Argentina to a 30–24 victory over Italy in a one-off test. He drew their test series with France 1–all, having won the first test 30–19, but lose the second test 27–0. The second test was the first time Argentina had failed to score any points in a test match since they lost 16–0 against Ireland in 2007. It was the first time they have failed to score any points against France since their first ever meeting in 1949. During the 2016 Rugby Championship, Hourcade led Argentina to their first ever home victory over South Africa, defeating the Springboks 26–24 in Salta during the second round of the Championship. However, this was their only victory of the Championship, as alongside their first round loss to South Africa, Argentina went onto lose their 4 remaining games against Australia and New Zealand. In a first ever meeting between Argentina and Japan since 2005, Hourcade led Argentina to a 54–20 victory against a side that had 13 debutantes, before going onto play Wales, Scotland and England, all resulting in a loss; 24–20, 19–16 and 27–14.

In June 2017, Argentina lost 2–0 to an inexperienced English side, losing both tests 38–34 and 35–25. Hourcade did however lead his side to a 45–29 victory over a touring Georgian side on their Americas tour. The 2017 Rugby Championship saw Argentina finish bottom of the table, after losing all six games and not recording a single bonus point - this is the first ever time they had done this, with 2013 being their previous worst Championship with only two points. Argentina started the competition with back-to-back loses to South Africa, 37–15 (away) and 23–41 (home). Their third-round game against New Zealand saw Argentina lead the All Blacks 16–15 at half time, and at the 60th minute the score was level at 22–all. However, substitutions were made on both sides and Argentina conceded 17 points in as many minutes to lose the game 39–22. In the fourth round, Argentina also lead Australia at half time, 13–10, but indiscipline and substitutions cost Argentina the game, losing 45–20. Despite being down 29–3 at half time at home to New Zealand, Hourcade's defensive systems pressured the All Blacks, and leading into overtime, New Zealand had still failed to score any points in the second half. However, a try at last play by newly capped David Havili saw New Zealand record a 36–10 victory. In the final round, Argentina once again led Australia 13–12 at half time, however Australia capitalized on defensive lapses to score three tries in the second half to see out the game 37–20. Argentina's poor form continued into the 2017 End-of-year tests, gaining just one win, coming against Italy 31–15. The other test were against England and Ireland, which were both defeats for Argentina, 21–8 and 28–19.

In June 2018, Hourcade led Argentina to back-to-back defeats to Wales, with the first test being a first loss at home to Wales since 2004. After losing the first test 23–10 in the two-test series, Hourcade made just one change to the starting XV ahead of the second test. Discipline proved an issue for the home side, who lost the test 30–12, conceding 12 penalties, seven of which were attempted kick at goal by the Welsh. Following the game, Hourcade announced his resignation as Pumas head coach, and that the test against Scotland the following week would be his last in charge. That game also ended in defeat, a record loss against Scotland at home, losing 44–15. The loss meant, Hourcade had won just 6 games in 28 games since the success of the 2015 Rugby World Cup.

International matches as head coach
Note: World Rankings Column shows the World Ranking Wales was placed at on the following Monday after each of their matches.

Record by country

Honours
CONSUR Cup
Winners: 2014, 2015
Killik Cup
Winner: 2015

Other honours
Pampas XV
Vodacom Cup
Winners: 2011

Argentina Jaguars
Americas Rugby Championship
Winners: 2010, 2012
World Rugby Nations Cup
Runners-up: 2012

References

1958 births
Living people
Argentine rugby union players
Argentine rugby union coaches
Argentina national rugby union team coaches
Universitario Rugby Club de Tucumán players
Rugby union fly-halves
Sportspeople from San Miguel de Tucumán